Idina Menzel: World Tour was a concert tour by actress and singer Idina Menzel.

Performances
Following the success of her critically acclaimed one night only concert at Radio City Music Hall and the release of her Christmas album Holiday Wishes, Menzel announced she would embark on World Tour: planning 54 concerts in various countries including America, Canada, the United Kingdom, South Korea, Japan, the Philippines and the Netherlands.

This is her first time doing a world tour.

In non-English speaking countries, Menzel sang a bilingual version of Let it Go, singing one of the song's stanzas in the country's language.

Concert synopsis 

Menzel is accompanied by a five-piece band, six-piece horn section, and four-piece orchestra. The show begins with video clips projected against a white curtain before Menzel emerges wearing a black strapless dress, starting the show with a lower version of Defying Gravity from Wicked and Don't Rain on My Parade from Funny Girl.

She then addresses the audience before performing Brave and the title track from her 2008 solo album I Stand. Next, Menzel talks about her role in Wicked and performs a lower version of The Wizard and I. Next, Menzel pulls up a stool for her cover of River from her 2014 Christmas album Holiday Wishes.

Menzel shares a story about an experience she had studying Theater at New York University and performs a mashup of Cole Porter's Love For Sale and The Police's Roxanne. Menzel performs a tribute to Ethel Merman in a medley of There's No Business Like Show Business, Anything Goes, and Everything's Coming Up Roses. Menzel then performs the title track of her debut studio album Still I Can't Be Still and a cover of Radiohead's Creep.

Menzel then performs Take Me Or Leave Me with volunteers from the audience and No Day But Today from the musical Rent, paying tribute to Jonathan Larson, the composer of the musical. Menzel shares her experience with the Broadway run of If/Then and performs Always Starting Over from the musical.

Menzel then introduces her musicians and thanks the audience before performing an a cappella rendition of For Good from Wicked and Let It Go from Frozen, inviting audience members to perform with her. Menzel then takes a bow, dances with her band, and leaves the stage.

Menzel returns to the stage to perform her new original song Child (dedicated to Walker Nathaniel Diggs) and Tomorrow from Annie.

Set list
"Defying Gravity" from Wicked
"Don't Rain on My Parade" from Funny Girl
"Brave" from I Stand
 "I Stand" from I Stand
 "The Wizard And I" from Wicked
 "River" from Holiday Wishes
 "Love for Sale" / "Roxanne"
 "There's No Business Like Show Business" / "Anything Goes" / "Everything's Coming Up Roses"
 "Still I Can't Be Still" from Still I Can't Be Still
 "Creep"
"Take Me or Leave Me" from Rent (impromptu duet with chosen audience members)
"No Day But Today" from Rent
 "Always Starting Over" from If/Then
"For Good" (a cappella) from Wicked
"Let It Go" from Frozen
Encore 
 "Child"
"Tomorrow" from Annie

Critical reception 
Idina Menzel: World Tour has garnered critical acclaim. Sharon Eberson of the Pittsburgh Post-Gazette wrote that Menzel was "a little bit naughty, a little bit nice and a little bit nutty, but always entertaining ... Each song, each story she told, was like unwrapping an elegantly wrapped package to see what surprise it held inside."

Melissa Ruggieri of The Atlanta Journal-Constitution opined, "What makes her live show so appealing is Menzel herself" because "She's funny." Ruggieri elaborated, "That's the thing about Menzel. Yes, the spotlight that comes with singing songs associated with 'The Wizard of Oz' ... and Disney cartoons ... But Menzel, 44, is an adult. And she sings about adult things". However, Ruggieri cited her performances of original songs "I Stand" and "Still I Can't Be Still", and rendition of "Take Me or Leave Me" alongside five audience members, among "a few moments that didn’t wow."

Personnel

Production
Music Director/Piano: Rob Mounsey
Tour Manager: Scott Cadwallader
Production Coordinator: Courtney Keene
Front of House Engineer: Alex Dakoglou
Monitor Engineer: Chris Trimby
Backline Technician: Brian Clairemont
Lightning/Set Designer: Abigail Rosen Holmes
Lighting Programmer: Felix Peralta
Lighting Director: Teddy Sosna
Stylist: Kemal Harris
Wardrobe: Joby Horrigan
Hair Stylist: Geo Brian Hennings

Musicians
Music Director/Piano: Rob Mounsey (Europe), Clifford Carter (North America)
Guitar: John Benthal
Bass: Sean Hurley
Drums: Rich Mercurio
Keyboards: Clifford Carter (Europe), Keith Cotton (North America) 
Menzel is also accompanied by an additional 10 orchestral musicians (Strings, Woodwinds, and Brass) serving as the local orchestra for each city.

Tour dates

References

2015 concert tours
Idina Menzel concert tours